Wotton-under-Edge Tower is a 76.2 metres ( 250 ft) tall telecommunication tower built of reinforced concrete at Wotton-under-Edge in Gloucestershire, UK. Wotton-under-Edge Tower is one of the few British towers built of reinforced concrete.

References

See also
British Telecom microwave network
Telecommunications towers in the United Kingdom

Communication towers in the United Kingdom
Towers in Gloucestershire
British Telecom buildings and structures
Transmitter sites in England
Wotton-under-Edge